Solariola is a genus of weevils in the family Curculionidae. The genus is endemic to Italy.

Taxonomy 
The genus was originally placed in the tribe Otiorhynchini, but it was moved to Peritelini on the basis of morphology. A 2019 study described 34 new species greatly increasing the genus size to 43 species.

Species 
There are currently 43 described species:

References 

Entiminae
Curculionidae genera